Antony Cotterill and Andrew Lapthorne defeated the five-time defending champions Nick Taylor and David Wagner in the final, 7–5, 1–6, 6–4 to win the quad title at the 2016 Wheelchair Doubles Masters.

Seeds

  Nick Taylor /  David Wagner (final)
  Antony Cotterill /  Andrew Lapthorne (champions)
  Greg Hasterok /  Ymanitu Silva (round robin, fourth place)
  Mika Ishikawa /  Kim Kyu-seung (round robin, third place)

Draw

Finals

Round robin

References

External links

Quad doubles draw

Masters, 2016